Radcliffe Bailey (born 1968) is a contemporary American artist noted for mixed-media, paint, and sculpture works that explore African-American history. He is currently based in Atlanta, Georgia.

Early life and education
Radcliffe Bailey was born in Bridgeton, New Jersey in 1968. At age 4, he moved to Atlanta, Georgia, which is where he currently resides. His interest in art was galvanised by childhood visits to the High Museum of Art and drawing classes he later took at the Atlanta College of Art. He cites Atlanta's history with civil rights and the Civil War as an artistic inspiration. Bailey received a Bachelor of Fine Arts in 1991 from the Atlanta College of Art. From 2001 to 2006, he taught in the Lamar Dodd School of Art at the University of Georgia.

Work 

Bailey was trained as a sculptor but experiments with paint and mixed media. He works within the convergence of painting and sculpture, utilising items such as vintage photographs of his family, vinyl records, piano keys and bottle-caps. Thematically, his art explores the intersection of ancestry, race and cultural memory. In 2003, he adopted a style of art conceptually inspired by Kongo minkisi, which he described as being "medicine cabinet sculptures." As a result, his work has been described as being three-dimensional and layered, incorporating elements of smell and sound. In a 2013 interview, Bailey described his creative process and fascination with the connection between past and present, stating: “The day by day experience of art, even though my work may seem to have this layer of history, it is also a cover for what I’m dealing with on a day to day. It’s very much about today. We were talking about where I go next: I’m still thinking about today and yesterday and what’s coming in front of me tomorrow." He is largely inspired by historic figures, citing individuals such as George Washington Carver and Charleston-based blacksmith Philip Simmons as sources of inspiration. His large-scale installation Windward Coast (2009-2011), was presented as part of the First International Biennial of Contemporary Art of Cartagena de Indias, Colombia. He has been awarded for his artistic contributions, receiving the Joan Foundation Grant in 2008 and Elizabeth and Mallory Factory Prize for Southern Art in 2010.

Solo exhibitions
Bailey has had solo exhibitions at many galleries and institutions including:

 The Mint Museum of Art, Charlotte, North Carolina, ARTCurrents II: Radcliffe Bailey (1992)
TULA Foundation Gallery, Atlanta, Georgia, Radcliffe Bailey: Places of Rebirth (1992)
Atlanta College of Art, Atlanta, Georgia, Spiritual Migration (2001)
Harvey B. Gantt Center for African American Arts & Culture, Charlotte, North Carolina, Between Two Worlds: The Art of Radcliffe Bailey (2009)
High Museum of Art, Atlanta, Georgia: Art of an Ancient Soul (2010), Radcliffe Bailey: Memory as Medicine (2011)
Bridget Mayer Gallery, Philadelphia, Pennsylvania, Notes (2015)
Contemporary Arts Center, New Orleans, Louisiana, US Radcliffe Bailey: Recent Works (2015)
SCAD Museum of Art Savannah, Georgia, Pensive (2018)

Collections
Bailey's work is held in many permanent collections including:
 The Metropolitan Museum of Art, New York, NY.
 The Smithsonian Museum of American Art, Washington, D.C.
 The National Gallery of Art, Washington, DC
 The Art Institute of Chicago, Illinois
 The Museum of Fine Arts, Houston, Texas
 The Nelson-Atkins Museum of Art, Kansas City, Missouri 
 The Denver Art Museum, Colorado
 The High Museum of Art, Atlanta, Georgia
 Nasher Museum of Art at Duke University, Durham, North Carolina

Personal life 
On June 27, 2009, Bailey married American actress, dancer, and producer Victoria Rowell in Dublin, New Hampshire. The wedding was announced in The New York Times. The couple divorced in 2014.

References

1968 births
Living people
People from Bridgeton, New Jersey
People from Atlanta
Artists from Atlanta
African-American artists
American contemporary artists
African-American contemporary artists
Atlanta College of Art alumni
Mixed-media artists
21st-century African-American people
20th-century African-American people